David or Dave Rowe may refer to:

Academics
 David C. Rowe (1949–2003), American psychologist
 David E. Rowe (born 1950), American mathematician and historian

Business and technology
 David Rowe (entrepreneur) (born 1958), British entrepreneur
 David Rowe (executive), director of the University of Warwick Science Park Ltd, West Midlands

Sports
 Dave Rowe (baseball) (1854–1930), baseball player
 Dave Rowe (American football) (born 1945), American football player
 David Rowe (cyclist) (born 1944), British 1972 Olympic cyclist
 David Rowe (tennis), Australian tennis player, see 1946 Australian Championships – Men's Singles

Other
 David Rowe-Beddoe, Baron Rowe-Beddoe (born 1937), British politician
 David H. Rowe, American politician from Pennsylvania
 David P. Rowe (born 1959), Jamaican-American lawyer
 Dave Rowe (musician) (born 1973), American folk singer from Maine
 David Rowe (cartoonist), Australian political cartoonist